The Antoine equation is a class of semi-empirical correlations describing the relation between vapor pressure and temperature for pure substances. The Antoine equation is derived from the Clausius–Clapeyron relation.  The equation was presented in 1888 by the French engineer  (1825–1897).

Equation
The Antoine equation is

The simplified form with  set to zero:

is the August equation, after the German physicist Ernst Ferdinand August (1795–1870). The August equation describes a linear relation between the logarithm of the pressure and the reciprocal temperature. This assumes a temperature-independent heat of vaporization. The Antoine equation allows an improved, but still inexact description of the change of the heat of vaporization with the temperature.

The Antoine equation can also be transformed in a temperature-explicit form with simple algebraic manipulations:

Validity range
Usually, the Antoine equation cannot be used to describe the entire saturated vapour pressure curve from the triple point to the critical point, because it is not flexible enough. Therefore, multiple parameter sets for a single component are commonly used. A low-pressure parameter set is used to describe the vapour pressure curve up to the normal boiling point and the second set of parameters is used for the range from the normal boiling point to the critical point.

Example parameters

Example calculation
The normal boiling point of ethanol is TB = 78.32 °C.

(760mmHg = 101.325kPa = 1.000atm = normal pressure)

This example shows a severe problem caused by using two different sets of coefficients. The described vapor pressure is not continuous—at the normal boiling point the two sets give different results. This causes severe problems for computational techniques which rely on a continuous vapor pressure curve.

Two solutions are possible: The first approach uses a single Antoine parameter set over a larger temperature range and accepts the increased deviation between calculated and real vapor pressures. A variant of this single set approach is using a special parameter set fitted for the examined temperature range. The second solution is switching to another vapor pressure equation with more than three parameters. Commonly used are simple extensions of the Antoine equation (see below) and the equations of DIPPR or Wagner.

Units
The coefficients of Antoine's equation are normally given in mmHg—even today where the SI is recommended and pascals are preferred. The usage of the pre-SI units has only historic reasons and originates directly from Antoine's original publication.

It is however easy to convert the parameters to different pressure and temperature units. For switching from degrees Celsius to kelvin it is sufficient to subtract 273.15 from the C parameter. For switching from millimeters of mercury to pascals it is sufficient to add the common logarithm of the factor between both units to the A parameter:

The parameters for °C and mmHg for ethanol
 A, 8.20417
 B, 1642.89 
 C, 230.300

are converted for K and Pa to
 A, 10.32907
 B, 1642.89
 C, −42.85

The first example calculation with TB = 351.47 K becomes

A similarly simple transformation can be used if the common logarithm should be exchanged by the natural logarithm. It is sufficient to multiply the A and B parameters by ln(10) = 2.302585.

The example calculation with the converted parameters (for K and Pa):
 A, 23.7836
 B, 3782.89
 C, −42.85

becomes

(The small differences in the results are only caused by the used limited precision of the coefficients).

Extension of the Antoine equations
To overcome the limits of the Antoine equation some simple extension by additional terms are used:

 

The additional parameters increase the flexibility of the equation and allow the description of the entire vapor pressure curve. The extended equation forms can be reduced to the original form by setting the additional parameters D, E and F to 0.

A further difference is that the extended equations use the e as base for the exponential function and the natural logarithm. This doesn't affect the equation form.

Sources for Antoine equation parameters
 NIST Chemistry WebBook
 Dortmund Data Bank
 Directory of reference books and data banks containing Antoine constants
 Several reference books and publications, e. g.
 Lange's Handbook of Chemistry, McGraw-Hill Professional
 Wichterle I., Linek J., "Antoine Vapor Pressure Constants of Pure Compounds"
 Yaws C. L., Yang H.-C., "To Estimate Vapor Pressure Easily. Antoine Coefficients Relate Vapor Pressure to Temperature for Almost 700 Major Organic Compounds", Hydrocarbon Processing, 68(10), Pages 65–68, 1989

See also
Vapour pressure of water
Arden Buck equation
Lee–Kesler method
Goff–Gratch equation
Raoult's law
Thermodynamic activity

References

External links
 Gallica, scanned original paper
 NIST Chemistry Web Book
 Calculation of vapor pressures with the Antoine equation

Equations
Thermodynamic equations